Matiu Rātana (16 December 1912 – 7 October 1949), son of Tahupotiki Wiremu Rātana, was a New Zealand politician and president of the Rātana Church.

Political career

A younger brother to Haami Tokouru Rātana he succeeded to the Church Presidency, and to the Western Maori electorate (from 10 February 1945, after a by-election) after his brother's death in 1944.

Matiu Rātana died on 7 October 1949 in Wanganui Hospital after a car accident. He was succeeded by his wife Iriaka Rātana as MP. She was the first female Māori MP.

Sources
 Henderson, James Mcleod (1963). Ratana The Man, The Church, The Movement (1st ed.) A.H & A.W. Reed Ltd .

References

1914 births
1949 deaths
New Zealand Labour Party MPs
Rātana MPs
Road incident deaths in New Zealand
New Zealand Rātanas
New Zealand MPs for Māori electorates
Members of the New Zealand House of Representatives
20th-century New Zealand politicians